Anita McConnell (1936–2016) PhD, JP, was a writer on the history of science and a curator of oceanography and geophysics at the Science Museum, London. She is most widely known for her popular Shire book on barometers but also wrote many books on the history of oceanography and British scientific instrument makers of the 18th and 19th centuries.

Early life
She was born in 1936 in Britain of Italian parents. During the Second World War she was sent as a child evacuee to the West Country and finished her secondary education with four O Levels. In 1957 she took a job location catering for such films as  The Inn of the Sixth Happiness and The Bridge on the River Kwai, the latter resulting in a six-month stay in Sri Lanka.

Career
In 1963 she took a job at the Science Museum, London, as an assistant with the Navigation and Meteorology collections. She later assisted with preparation work for setting up the National Railway Museum. In 1973 she rejoined the Science Museum to become curator of Oceanography and Geophysics. From 1961 to 1979 she successively attained a diploma in archaeology, a degree in geography, a master's degree in history of technology and a doctorate from the University of Leicester, which appeared in print as No Sea Too Deep, The History of Oceanographic Instruments.

She began writing in 1980 and published works particularly on the history of oceanography and British scientific instrument makers of the 18th and 19th centuries. Her popular book on barometers was written in 1988. In her work on oceanographic instruments she was noted for the level of detail achieved and in her biographies of scientific instrument makers she was noted for her ability to work from archived material such as clients letters.

In 1993 she became a research editor for the Dictionary of National Biography for Oxford University Press, initially working on entries for instrument makers and clock makers, and later, also on science and medicine.

Awards and honours 

 Since 1968, she was an emeritus fellow of the Royal Geographical Society.
 She was a fellow of the Royal Society of Arts
 she was a fellow of the Royal Meteorological Society
 She was a fellow of the Hakluyt Society.

Selected publications
 Geomagnetic Instruments Before 1900: An Illustrated Account of their Construction and Use (London: Harriet Wynter) 1980.
 Historical Instruments in Oceanography: Background to the Oceanography Collection at the Science Museum (London: HMSO) 1981
 No Sea Too Deep: The History of Oceanographic Instruments (Bristol: Adam Hilger) 1982
 (with Lambert, D), Seas and Oceans (London: Orbis Publications) 1985
 The World Beneath Us (London: Orbis Publications) 1985
 Barometers (Princes Risborough: Shire Publications) 1988
 Directory of source material for the history of oceanography, UNESCO Technical Paper in Marine Science, UNESCO, Paris 1990
 Instrument Makers to the World: A History of Cooke, Troughton & Simms (York: William Sessions/University of York) 1992
 R B Bate of the Poultry 1782–1847: The Life and Times of a Scientific Instrument Maker (London: Scientific Instrument Society) 1993
 King of the Clinicals: The Life and Times of J J Hicks (York: William Sessions) 1998
 translation, introduction and notes for Marsigli, L F, Natural History of the Sea (Bologna: Museo di Fisica dell’Università di Bologna) 1999
 Jesse Ramsden (1735–1800): London’s Leading Scientific Instrument Maker (Aldershot: Ashgate Publishing) 2007

References 

British oceanographers
British women non-fiction writers
British women scientists
20th-century British women writers
Alumni of the University of Leicester
1936 births
2016 deaths
People associated with the Science Museum, London